Westerly State Airport  is a public use airport in Washington County, Rhode Island, United States. It is primarily a general aviation airport, but there is also scheduled airline service to Block Island provided by New England Airlines.

As per Federal Aviation Administration records, the airport had 11,201 passenger boardings (enplanements) in calendar year 2008, 8,804 enplanements in 2009, and 11,402 in 2010. It is included in the Federal Aviation Administration (FAA) National Plan of Integrated Airport Systems for 2017–2021, in which it is categorized as a non-hub primary commercial service facility.

Westerly State Airport is one of six active airports operated by the Rhode Island Airport Corporation. The other five airports include T.F. Green State Airport, Newport State Airport, North Central State Airport, Quonset State Airport, and Block Island State Airport.

History
Westerly State began as a grass strip in the 1920s, and became the second state-owned airport in the United States (after T.F. Green Airport) in the 1940s.  The airport was paved and expanded when it became a U.S. Navy base during World War II, due to its prime location halfway between Boston and New York City.

Facilities and aircraft

It has two runways with asphalt surfaces:

Runway 7/25 is 
Runway 14/32 is 

In 2005,  in federal funding was allocated to repair and improve the main runway and taxiways.  As of November 2006, improvements were finished and the main runway is open.

For the 12-month period ending June 30, 2011, the airport had 19,503 aircraft operations, an average of 53 per day: 68% general aviation, 32% air taxi, and <1% military. At that time there were 53 aircraft based at this airport: 85% single-engine, 13% multi-engine, and 2% helicopter.

Airlines and destinations

Passenger

References

External links
 Westerly State Airport (WST) page from Rhode Island Airport Corp.
 
 Aerial image as of April 2001 from USGS The National Map
 

Airports in Rhode Island
Transportation buildings and structures in Washington County, Rhode Island
Westerly, Rhode Island